Emine Bilgin (born July 15, 1984) is a Turkish European champion in weightlifting competing in the 53 kg and 58 kg division.

Anti doping
While training in Çorum for the upcoming 2010 European Weightlifting Championships, Emine Bilgin was tested positive to banned substance in a routine check. She was later officially suspended from competition until March 28, 2014.

Medals
World Championships

European Championships

 Mediterranean Games

References

External links
International Weightlifting Federation

1984 births
Living people
Turkish female weightlifters
Place of birth missing (living people)
Doping cases in weightlifting
European champions in weightlifting
European champions for Turkey
Mediterranean Games gold medalists for Turkey
Mediterranean Games medalists in weightlifting
Competitors at the 2001 Mediterranean Games
European Weightlifting Championships medalists
21st-century Turkish sportswomen